The Recollection Thief (Kradljivac uspomena) is a 2007 Croatian film directed by Vicko Ruić, starring Nikša Kušelj and Sven Medvešek. It is based on Dino Milinović's novel of the same name.

References

External links
 

2007 films
Croatian crime films
2000s Croatian-language films
Films based on Croatian novels
2000s political thriller films
Films set in 1999
Croatian thriller films
Films set in Croatia